The Stolen Years refers to:

 The Stolen Years (1998 film), Spanish film
 The Stolen Years (2013 film), Chinese film